Ataxin 8 opposite strand, also known as ATXN8OS, is a human gene.

Function 

SCA8 is an antisense transcript to the KLHL1 gene (homolog to the Drosophila KELCH gene); it does not itself appear to be protein coding. A cytidine, thymidine, guanosine (CTG) trinucleotide repeat expansion that is incorporated into the SCA8 but not the KLHL1 transcript causes spinocerebellar ataxia type 8. When the CTG expansion is present, a polyglutamine mutant protein is produced. Presumably the expansion interferes with normal antisense function of this transcript.

See also 
RAN translation
Trinucleotide repeat disorder

References

Further reading

External links 
  GeneReviews/NCBI/NIH/UW entry on Spinocerebellar Ataxia Type 8